Princess Augusta of Hesse-Kassel (Augusta Wilhelmina Louisa; 25 July 1797 – 6 April 1889) was the wife of Prince Adolphus, Duke of Cambridge, the tenth-born child, and seventh son, of George III of the United Kingdom and Charlotte of Mecklenburg-Strelitz. The longest-lived daughter-in-law of George III, she was the maternal grandmother of Mary of Teck, wife of George V.

Early life
Princess and Landgravine Augusta of Hesse-Kassel, third daughter of Prince Frederick of Hesse-Kassel, and his wife, Princess Caroline of Nassau-Usingen, was born at Rumpenheim Castle (French: Château de Rumpenheim, German: Rumpenheimer Schloss), Offenbach am Main, Hesse. Through her father, she was a great-granddaughter of George II of Great Britain, her grandmother being George II's daughter Mary. Her father's older brother was the Landgrave of Hesse-Kassel. In 1803, her uncle's title was raised to Elector of Hesse—whereby the entire Kassel branch of the Hesse dynasty gained an upward notch in hierarchy.

Marriage
On 7 May, in Kassel, and then, again, on 1 June 1818 at Buckingham Palace, Princess Augusta married her second cousin, the Duke of Cambridge, when she was 20 and he 44. Upon their marriage, Augusta became Duchess of Cambridge. They had three children.

From 1818 until the accession of Queen Victoria, and the separation of the British and Hanoverian crowns in 1837, the Duchess of Cambridge lived in Hanover, where the Duke served as viceroy on behalf of his brothers, George IV and William IV. In 1827 Augusta allowed that a new village, founded on  3 May 1827 and to be settled in the course of the cultivation and colonisation of the moorlands in the south of Bremervörde, would bear her name. On 19 June the administration of the Hanoveran High-Bailiwick of Stade informed the villagers that she had approved the chosen name Augustendorf for their municipality (since 1974 it is a component locality of Gnarrenburg). The Duke and Duchess of Cambridge returned to Great Britain, where they lived at Cambridge Cottage, Kew, and later at St. James's Palace.

Death
The Duchess of Cambridge survived her husband by thirty-nine years, dying on 6 April 1889, at the age of ninety-one, at their home at Cambridge Cottage on Kew Green. Queen Victoria wrote of her aunt's death: "Very sad, though not for her. But she is the last of her generation, & I have no longer anyone above me."

She was buried at St Anne's Church, Kew, but her remains were transferred to St George's Chapel, Windsor Castle in 1930.

Titles and styles
25 July 1797 – 7 May 1818: Her Serene Highness Princess Augusta Wilhelmina Louisa of Hesse
7 May 1818 – 6 April 1889: Her Royal Highness The Duchess of Cambridge

Ancestry

Issue
The Duke and Duchess of Cambridge had three children:

References

Further reading 
 

1797 births
1889 deaths
19th-century British people
19th-century British women
Wives of British princes
Burials at St George's Chapel, Windsor Castle
Companions of the Order of the Crown of India
Hanoverian princesses by marriage
House of Hesse-Kassel
Landgravines of Hesse-Kassel
Women of the Victorian era
Duchesses of Cambridge
Royal reburials